Maplewood may refer to:

Cities, towns, etc.
 Maplewood, Indiana
 Maplewood, Minnesota
 Maplewood, Missouri
 Maplewood, New Jersey
 Maplewood (NJT station), a New Jersey Transit station in Maplewood, New Jersey
 Maplewood, Albany County, New York (non-CDP community/hamlet)
 Maplewood, Sullivan County, New York (non-CDP community/hamlet)
 Maplewood, Ohio
 Maplewood, Portland, Oregon, a neighborhood
 Maplewood, Houston, Texas, a neighborhood
 Maplewood, Fall River, Massachusetts (neighborhood in Fall River, Massachusetts)
 Maplewood, Nova Scotia
 Maplewood, Virginia
 Maplewood, Washington
 Maplewood, West Virginia
 Maplewood, Wisconsin

Places on the National Register of Historic Places (NRHP)
Maplewood (Pembroke, Kentucky), listed on the NRHP in Christian County, Kentucky
Maplewood (Walton, Kentucky), listed on the NRHP in Boone County, Kentucky
Maplewood (Columbia, Missouri), NRHP-listed
Maplewood Commercial Historic District at Manchester and Sutton, Maplewood, Missouri, listed on the NRHP in St. Louis County, Missouri
Maplewood (Montgomery Township, New Jersey), listed on the NRHP in Somerset County, New Jersey
Maplewood Historic District, Rochester, New York, NRHP-listed
Maplewood (Chesapeake, Ohio), listed on the NRHP in Lawrence County, Ohio
Maplewood (Pliny, West Virginia), listed on the NRHP in Mason County, West Virginia

Other 
Maplewood (EP), by Ed Harcourt
Maplewood (Milford, New Hampshire), listed on the New Hampshire State Register of Historic Places
SS Maplewood, cargo ship sunk during World War I.

See also
 Maplewood Parent Cooperative, a K-8 public school in Edmonds, Washington
 Maple Woods Community College, a campus of Metropolitan Community College in Kansas City
 Maplewood Mall, a shopping mall in Maplewood, Minnesota
 Maplewood Cemetery (Pulaski, Tennessee), a historic cemetery in Pulaski, Tennessee, U.S.
 Maple (wood)